All My Friends is an EP by House of Freaks released on CD (R2 70943) and 12" vinyl (R1 70943) in 1989 by Rhino Records. In 2004, these tracks were remastered and included on the reissue of the album Tantilla. Recording occurred at Floodzone Studios in Richmond, VA. The album's cover image is a collage of photos consisting of friends and acquaintances of band members Bryan Harvey and Johnny Hott.  Included in the collage, above the EP's title, is a photo of Sparklehorse founder Mark Linkous, who occasionally performed with House of Freaks.

Track listing
All tracks by House of Freaks

 "Ten More Minutes To Live"
 "This Old Town"
 "Pass Me The Gun"
 "You Can't Change The World Anymore"
 "You'll Never See The Light Of Day"

Personnel 
Tater Brix – Jew's-harp
Bryan Harvey – guitar, vocals
Johnny Hott – drums
House of Freaks – producer
Zip Irvin – baritone sax
Jocko MacNelly – guitar
Bruce Olsen – producer, engineer
Mike Stavrou – engineer
Paul Watson – trumpet

References

External links
Rhino Handmade: Tantilla by the House of Freaks

House of Freaks albums
1989 EPs
Rhino Entertainment EPs